Ningolai is a village in swat(Khyber Pakhtoon Khwa) Pakistan. Old name was Ningula which was named by a person name Ningula. Later it was named Ningolai by the Rular of Swat State.
The people of village Ningolai belong to subsection Naikpikhel of Yusufzai the biggest and largest tribe of Pashtun tribes. The village contains a small series of mountains and a forest, residential area starting from meadows of mountainsand merge with river swat on  right bank, vast land for crops, number of  canals, and a part of the Swat river.  Mountains of the village include Usmani Ghar, Kursi Ghat, Kafar Ghat and Najia.

Location 
It is about 12 Kilometers away from Mingawara or Mingora, The main city of Swat Valley and 14 Kilometers from Saidu Sharif
the Capital of the Yousufzai State of Swat (Princely State). Situated on the left bank (North side) of Suvastu or The River Swat. Shakardara is on the East, Bara Bandai and Kuza Bandai on the West.

References

Swat District
Tehsils of Swat District
Populated places in Swat District